Colobraro is a town and comune in the province of Matera, in the southern Italian region of Basilicata. The town is positioned on a high hill dominating the valley of river Sinni near the town of Valsinni.

Geography
Colobraro is located in southern Italy in the region of Basilicata. It  is one of the agricultural centers in the Sinni River valley. It is located on the southern slopes of Mount Calvario at a height of 630 m, with views of the whole Ionian Sea coast. Colobraro is located near Highway 653, not far from the dam built on the Sinni river and Mount Cotugno. It borders the towns of Valsinni, Tursi, Rotondella, Senise, Sant'Arcangelo and Noepoli. Colobraro is about 80 km from the province's capital of Matera, and about 130 km from the region's capital of Potenza.

History
The hamlet is known as the "village without name": its name is considered bringer of bad luck in the towns around, where Colobraro is usually mentioned in the local dialects simply as chillu paese, cudd' puaise or chill' pais, all simply meaning "that village".

The reason for Colobraro being called “that village” or “the unlucky village” is because a lawyer, who had won many cases, was pursuing a case in this town, and he proclaimed that if he was not correct, that the chandelier which was in the court would fall. At that exact moment, the chandelier fell and shattered. Ever since the town became known for being associated with unluckiness. 

Throughout, many instances of freak accidents, and instances involving 'masciare', powerful women that were known in the 1950s in southern Italy for casting spells and using black magic, finished the reputation for Colobraro being unlucky, and being cursed. 

Not only, the name Colobraro, derives from the Latin word 'coluber', meaning serpent, seen as the embodiment of evil.

References

Cities and towns in Basilicata